(born June 16, 1984) is a Japanese actress, model, dancer and beauty pageant titleholder. She competed in the Miss Universe 2009 pageant on August 23, 2009, held in the Bahamas, but didn't place.

Miss Universe Japan 2009
Miyasaka beat more than 3,000 applicants for the title of Miss Universe Japan.

Controversies
When Miyasaka appeared with her revealing national costume, her comment was, "even as a representative of my country I want to express my individuality. I’m trying as hard as I can to appeal based on the kindness and modest of the Japanese!" However, the costume triggered backlash from Japanese critics, claiming the costume was "a national disgrace", "made fun of Japanese traditional clothing and culture", and was "a stupidly designed stupid costume for a stupid person to wear". The costume was designed by Yoshiyuki Ogata for the Yoshiyuki brand, along with Japan's Miss Universe franchise holder and director Ligron. Originally, the skirt was longer, but Ligron decided to shorten it in a hasty decision taken before the press conference. After the uproar, Ligron defended the costume, saying that the critics were "dinosaurs". Nonetheless, Miyasaka wore a more conservative version of the design at the actual pageant.

References

External links
 Profile at OscarPromotion 

Living people
1984 births
People from Tokyo
Miss Universe 2009 contestants
Japanese beauty pageant winners
Japanese female models
Japanese female dancers
Japanese actresses
Seijo University alumni
Models from Tokyo Metropolis